The Yeoman of the Guard is a 1978 British TV version of the Gilbert and Sullivan's Savoy opera The Yeomen of the Guard.

It was a filmed version of a 1978 stage production which was performed in the Tower of London during the festival of the city of London, at a budget of £150,000.

Cast
Tommy Steele as Jack Point
Laureen Livingstone as Elsie Maynard
Paul Hudson as Sergeant Meryll
Della Jones as Phoebe Meryll
Anne Collins as Dame Carruthers
Hilary Western as Kate Carruthers
Dennis Wicks as Wilfred Shadbolt
David Fieldsend as Leonard Meryll
Tom McDonnell as Sir Richard Cholmondley
Terry Jenkins as Colonel Fairfax

Production

The film was directed and produced by Stanley Dorfman for ATV. The choreography was by Gillian Lynne. The music of Arthur Sullivan was performed by the New World Philharmonic Orchestra, conducted by David Lloyd-Jones.

References

External links
Yeoman of the Guard at BFI
Yeoman of the Guard at IMDb

1978 television films
1978 films